Fermo Guisoni (died after 1566) was an Italian painter of the Renaissance period, active mainly in his native city of Mantua. 

He was one of the main assistants in the studio of painter Giulio Romano. He painted the cupola of the cathedral of Mantua. He painted an admired Crucifixion with Peter and Andrew. He also frescoed a cartoon of Romano's depicting Peter and Paul as fisherman. According to Vasari, the other pupils of Giulio Romano were Gian dal Lione, Raffaello da Colle Borghese, Benedetto Pagni da Pescia, Figurino da Faenza, Rinaldo Mantovano and Giovanni Battista Bertani (Mantovani).

References

Painters from Mantua
16th-century Italian painters
Italian male painters
Italian Mannerist painters
Fresco painters